or Gamō Yasuhide was a Japanese daimyō of the Sengoku and Azuchi–Momoyama periods. He was heir and son of Gamō Katahide, lord of Hino Castle in Ōmi Province, he later held Matsusaka (Ise Province) and finally Aizuwakamatsu Castle in Mutsu Province. He also controlled Obama Castle through one of his retainers, Gamō Chūzaemon.

Early life and rise
In 1568, Oda Nobunaga, who was en route to Kyoto, defeated the Rokkaku clan, who were the masters of Tsuruchiyo's father, . Upon the Rokkaku clan's defeat, Katahide as a former influential vassal, pledged loyalty to Nobunaga, and became an Oda retainer. However, the price of Katahide's pledge was giving up his son as a hostage, and so Tsuruchiyo was taken to Gifu, then the Oda clan's headquarters.

Tsuruchiyo's sagacity impressed Nobunaga, and soon, the young man had his manhood rite in Gifu, taking the name . In the summer of 1569, Yasuhide took part in his first campaign, during Nobunaga's subjugation of Kitabatake Tomomasa of Kizukuri Castle. For his distinction in battle, Nobunaga gave his daughter Fuyuhime in marriage to Yasuhide, affectionately referring to Yasuhide as "my little son-in-law." At the same time, he was allowed to return to his father's castle at Hino. Though Fuyuhime was still young at this point, she is said to have later matured into a stunningly beautiful woman.

Military Life

Service under Nobunaga
Following the betrayal of Azai Nagamasa, Gamō Katahide assisted in Nobunaga's withdrawal from Kanegasaki by taking him into his own Hino Castle, and facilitating his escape to Gifu from there. In recognition of this feat, Nobunaga gave Yasuhide and his father a stipend increase, and posted them to southern Omi, under the command of Shibata Katsuie.

In 1570, Yasuhide fought at the Battle of Anegawa, and later that same year, joined his father in the Oda assault on the Asakura clan of Echizen Province. The two led a force of 1,000 men as the vanguard of Shibata Katsuie's army. The total number of men under Katsuie's overall command at that battle totaled 5,000. Of those 5,000, the number under Katsuie's command totaled 600, so this may give some impression of the importance of the Gamō family.  

The Gamō would see action against the Asakura once more, in 1573. In 1575, upon Katsuie's posting to Kitanosho Castle, the Gamō, ruling from their castle at Hino, came under Nobunaga's direct command, serving as hatamoto. In 1581, he participated on Second Tenshō Iga War in the Siege of Hijiyama.

Service under Hideyoshi
When Nobunaga was assassinated in 1582, Yasuhide was with his father, who had been posted as warden of Azuchi Castle. Together, the two sheltered Nobunaga's wife and children in Hino Castle, saving their lives. In the same year, Yasuhide submitted to Hashiba Hideyoshi. In this year, his son Tsuruchiyo (Gamō Hideyuki) was born.

Following his siege of Oda Nobukatsu at Kanie castle during the Battle of Komaki and Nagakute in 1585, he received Matsusaka, in the southern section of Ise Province, as his fief (rated at 120,000 koku). After taking part in the subjugation of Kii Province and Kyushu in 1585, Yasuhide took the name of "Ujisato." Soon after, due to the influence of Takayama Ukon, he received a Christian baptism in Osaka, and took the baptismal name of Leo.

Ujisato took part in all of Hideyoshi's subsequent campaigns: Kyushu Campaign, the Siege of Odawara (1590), the pacification of Ōshū (Mutsu and Dewa Provinces) (1590). For his role in the pacification of Ōshū, he received a 420,000 koku fief with its headquarters at Kurokawa Castle in Aizu. He renamed the castle Wakamatsu, the name which even the town retains to this day. 

In preparation for the Japanese invasions of Korea, Ujisato proceeded in 1592 to Hideyoshi's base in Nagoya in Hizen Province. He fell ill there, coughing up blood in early 1593. From Nagoya, he headed first to Aizu, and then to Fushimi, where the Gamō family's mansion was almost complete. Hideyoshi himself would visit the mansion twice after its completion

Death
Ujisato died in 1595, at age 40, at Fushimi Castle. Though his family would lose Aizu soon after with Gamō Hideyuki's transfer to Utsunomiya, the Gamō would later be returned to Aizu by Tokugawa Ieyasu.

Family
 Father: Gamō Katahide
 Mother: Okiri no Kata
 Wife: Fuyuhime (1561–1641)
 Children:
 Takehime married Nanbu Toshinao by Fuyuhime
 Sekihime married Maeda Toshimasa by Fuyuhime
 Gamō Ujitoshi by Fuyuhime
 Gamō Hideyuki by Fuyuhime

Aizu Shintōgo sword
Sword made by Shintōgo Kunimitsu owned by Gamō Ujisato. The name, "Aizu", refers to the Aizu area which he controlled.

Notes

References and further reading
Arai Masayoshi , Nihonshi jiten . Tokyo: Ōbunsha , 1987, p. 91.
Noguchi Shin'ichi , Aizu-han . Tokyo: Gendai Shokan , 2005.

External links

Further reading 

1556 births
1595 deaths
Daimyo
Japanese Roman Catholics
Gamō clan
Oda retainers
Deified Japanese people
People from Shiga Prefecture